Zschopau, is a town in the Erzgebirgskreis district of Saxony, Germany.

Geography
The municipal area comprises the village of Krumhermersdorf, incorporated in 1999. Since German reunification, Zschopau has lost about one fourth of its population.

Zschopau is famous for its motorcycle industry, particularly the DKW and MZ Motorrad- und Zweiradwerk GmbH brands, and the toy business VEB Plasticart.

Zschopau has a handsome parish church dedicated to St Martin, a town hall and a castle (Schloss Wildeck), whose construction started in the twelfth century.

Historical population

Notable people
 Heinz Auerswald (1891-1974), painter not to be confused with Heinz Auerswald German lawyer, Nazi party, 1908 - 1970
 Marcus Burghardt (born 1983), bicycle racer
 Ulf Findeisen (born 1962), ski jumper
 David Füleki (born 1985), comic artist and non-fiction author
 Rebekka Haase (born 1993), athlete (sprinter)
 Axel Jungk (born 1991), skeleton racer
 Walter Kaaden (1919–1996), engineer
 Karl Kröner (1887–1972), painter

 Claudia Nystad (born 1978), cross country skier
 Karl Schmidt-Hellerau (1873–1948), furniture manufacturer and social reformer
Stefan Semmler (born 1952), rower
 Frank Uhlig (born 1955), footballer
 Roland Wieser (born 1956), racewalker

Personalities who have worked on the ground

 Carl Hahn (1894-1961), German-Austrian automobile builder and entrepreneur, father of VW manager Carl Hahn
 Walter Kaaden (1919-1996), engineer
 Christian Liebe (1654-1708), composer
 Jørgen Skafte Rasmussen (1878-1964), Danish engineer and industrialist
 Hermann Weber (1896-1948), Constructor
 Valentin Weigel (1533-1588), mystical theosophical writer, priest and natural philosopher
 Clara Zetkin (1857-1933), socialist politician and women's rights activist

Pictures

Notes

References

External links

 http://www.zschopau.de/ Official city homepage
 

Erzgebirgskreis